Schweinfurt Central Station may refer to:

 Schweinfurt Hauptbahnhof, Schweinfurt's main railway station
 Schweinfurt Mitte station, a central railway station in Schweinfurt